Rosenblattichthys volucris, the chubby pearleye,  is a species of fish found in the Pacific Ocean.

References 

Aulopiformes
Taxa named by Robert Rees Rofen
Fish described in 1966